The following radio stations broadcast on FM frequency 100.3 MHz:

Argentina
 Trip in Rosario, Santa Fe
 Pueblo Esther in Pueblo Esther, Santa Fe

Australia
 2MCR in Campbelltown, New South Wales
 ABC NewsRadio in Mildura, Victoria
 4BAY in Brisbane, Queensland
 2NEB in Armidale, New South Wales
 Hot FM in Mackay, Queensland
 3MEL in Melbourne, Victoria
 5EZY in Adelaide, South Australia
 TLCFM In Yamba, New South Wales
 2YAS in Yass, New South Wales

Canada (Channel 262)
 CBAF-FM-4 in Edmundston, New Brunswick
 CBAP-FM in Shelburne, Nova Scotia
 CBQU-FM in Pikangikum, Ontario
 CBTS-FM in Creston, British Columbia
 CFAQ-FM in Blucher, Saskatchewan
 CFBR-FM in Edmonton, Alberta
 CFKI-FM in Kitimat, British Columbia
 CFOZ-FM in Argentia, Newfoundland and Labrador
 CFPA-FM in Port Alice, British Columbia
 CFTL-FM in Big Trout Lake, Ontario
 CHTN-FM in Charlottetown, Prince Edward Island
 CHVD-FM in Dolbeau, Quebec
 CIHW-FM in Loretteville, Quebec
 CIRA-FM-1 in Sherbrooke, Quebec
 CJLF-FM in Barrie, Ontario
 CJMC-FM in Ste-Anne-des-Monts, Quebec
 CJMJ-FM in Ottawa, Ontario
 CJVR-FM-1 in Dafoe, Saskatchewan
 CKCQ-FM in Quesnel, British Columbia
 CKKQ-FM in Victoria, British Columbia
 CKRZ-FM in Ohsweken, Ontario

China 
 CNR Business Radio in Benxi

Honduras 
HRAX - Musiquera, Santa Bárbara, Santa Bárbara

HRAX - Musiquera, Santa Cruz de Yojoa, Cortés

HRAX - Musiquera, Ocotepeque, Ocotepeque

HRAX - Musiquera, La Entrada, Copán

HRAX - Musiquera, Santa Rosa de Copán

HRZA - Radio Guarajambala, La Esperanza, Intibucá

Ireland
 Radio Nova in Dublin

Malaysia
 Pahang FM in Cameron Highlands, Pahang

Mexico
XHAGI-FM in Aguililla, Michoacán
XHAV-FM in Guadalajara, Jalisco
 XHDX-FM in Ensenada, Baja California
 XHEN-FM in Torreón, Coahuila
XHMI-FM in Campeche, Campeche
 XHPP-FM in Fortín, Veracruz
 XHPTOM-FM in Puerto Morelos, Quintana Roo
 XHQUE-FM in Querétaro, Querétaro
 XHSD-FM in Hermosillo, Sonora
 XHTF-FM in Monclova, Coahuila
 XHTNY-FM in Tepic, Nayarit
 XHVDR-FM in Cacahoatán, Chiapas
 XHXZ-FM in Apizaco, Tlaxcala
 XHZS-FM in Mazatlán, Sinaloa

Philippines (Channel 262)
DZRJ-FM in Metro Manila
DWHI in Legazpi City, Albay
DYRJ-FM in Cebu City
DXDJ-FM in Davao City

Portugal
Antena 3 in Lisbon

Singapore
 UFM100.3 in Singapore

Taiwan
National Education Radio Education network in Yuli
Bao dao Radio Station() in Chiayi

United Kingdom
 in Glasgow
 in Durham, Bradford and South Hampshire,

United States (Channel 262)
 KACG in Goldfield, Nevada
  in Hilo, Hawaii
 KATZ-FM in Bridgeton, Missouri
  in San Jose, California
 KBWN-LP in Buena, Washington
  in Honolulu, Hawaii
 KCUG-LP in Omaha, Nebraska
  in Osceola, Missouri
 KCWG-LP in Crown King, Arizona
  in Taft, Oklahoma
 KCYY in San Antonio, Texas
  in Jacksonville, Arkansas
  in Des Moines, Iowa
  in Topeka, Kansas
 KEAJ-LP in Cell Site, Montana
 KFXN-FM in Minneapolis, Minnesota
  in Rapid City, South Dakota
 KHEX in Concow, California
  in Nome, Alaska
  in Houston, Texas
  in Denver, Colorado
 KJCM (FM) in Snyder, Oklahoma
 KJKK in Dallas, Texas
  in Blythe, California
  in North Pole, Alaska
 KKLQ in Los Angeles, California
  in Portland, Oregon
 KLRZ in Larose, Louisiana
  in Great Falls, Montana
  in Orange Cove, California
 KMMX in Tahoka, Texas
 KMOB-LP in Clearlake, California
  in Arlington, Kansas
  in Agana, Guam
 KOMX in Pampa, Texas
  in Albuquerque, New Mexico
 KPYT-LP in Tucson, Arizona
  in Globe, Arizona
 KQUI-LP in Ulysses, Kansas
 KQUT-LP in Saint George, Utah
  in Payette, Idaho
  in Colby, Kansas
  in Lompoc, California
  in Alexandria, Louisiana
  in Gold Hill, Oregon
 KSBK in Blanca, Colorado
  in Salt Lake City, Utah
  in Thief River Falls, Minnesota
 KSRB-LP in Corpus Christi, Texas
 KTEX in Mercedes, Texas
 KUCP-LP in Kent, Washington
 KUKU-FM in Willow Springs, Missouri
 KURM-FM in Gravette, Arkansas
 KVFS-LP in Spokane, Washington
  in Garapan-Saipan, Northern Mariana Islands
  in Fortuna, California
 KWSI-LP in Grand Junction, Colorado
 KXAA in Cle Elum, Washington
 KXPM-LP in Perham, Minnesota
 KXRF-LP in Dodge, North Dakota
  in Central City, Nebraska
  in Greybull, Wyoming
 KZQX in Tatum, Texas
 WAFD in Webster Springs, West Virginia
 WAPP-LP in Westhampton, New York
 WAUE in Waverly, Alabama
 WBBY-LP in Berwick, Pennsylvania
  in Washington, District of Columbia
 WBZI in Xenia, Ohio
  in Savanna, Illinois
 WCLT-FM in Newark, Ohio
  in Plantation Key, Florida
 WCYQ in Oak Ridge, Tennessee
  in Delhi, New York
 WFFG-FM in Warrensburg, New York
  in Grayling, Michigan
  in Meadville, Pennsylvania
 WHEB in Portsmouth, New Hampshire
  in Canton, Pennsylvania
 WHGW-LP in Morganton, North Carolina
  in Newark, New Jersey
  in Aguadilla, Puerto Rico
  in Champaign, Illinois
 WJLW-LP in Greensburg, Pennsylvania
 WKIT in Brewer, Maine
  in Middletown, Rhode Island
 WKYV in Petersburg, Virginia
  in Harkers Island, North Carolina
  in Angola, Indiana
 WLML-FM in Lake Park, Florida
 WMKS in High Point, North Carolina
 WMVU in Sylvan Beach, New York
 WNAR-LP in Arcade, New York
  in Neenah-Menasha, Wisconsin
 WNIC in Dearborn, Michigan
  in Laurel, Mississippi
 WOBB in Tifton, Georgia
  in Elloree, South Carolina
 WOSL in Norwood, Ohio
 WQNB-LP in Miami, Florida
  in Meridianville, Alabama
 WRKE-LP in Salem, Virginia
 WRMK-LP in Augusta, Georgia
 WRNB in Media, Pennsylvania
  in Orlando, Florida
  in Atlantic Beach, South Carolina
  in Chicago, Illinois
 WSMX-FM in Goshen, Alabama
  in Christiansted, Virgin Islands
 WTKE-FM in Niceville, Florida
 WUPT (FM) in Gwinn, Michigan
 WVMK-LP in Vicksburg, Mississippi
  in Hopkinsville, Kentucky
 WVZM-LP in Memphis, Tennessee
 WWOP-LP in Ocean City, Maryland
 WWZR-LP in Brunswick, Georgia
  in Edinburgh, Indiana
 WYLT-LP in Rocky Mount, North Carolina

References

Lists of radio stations by frequency